Osteochilus bleekeri is a species of cyprinid fish endemic to Borneo and Sumatra.

Etymology
Named in honor of Dutch medical doctor and ichthyologist Pieter Bleeker (1819-1878), who reported this species as Rohita triporos (=O. [Neorohita] microcephalus) in 1852.

References

Taxa named by Maurice Kottelat
Fish described in 2008
Osteochilus